Ficus mariae is a species of tree in the family Moraceae. It is native to South America.

References

mariae
Trees of Peru
Trees of Brazil
Trees of Bolivia